Gotcha! Extreme Paintball (also known as Gotcha! in Europe) is a first person paintball video game developed by Sixteen Tons Entertainment and published by Gathering. The game was produced by Ralph Stock. It was released on Microsoft Windows and Xbox in Germany first in 2004, and the rest of Europe in 2004 and 2005, following a release in North America in 2006, published by Viva Media.

Gameplay 

Gotcha! Extreme Paintball is a non-violent first-person shooter in which the characters play paintball. Its gameplay is inspired in particular by Counter-Strike. The game can be played alone or with others, through a local network or direct connection. The player can choose between 18 male and female top players, 12 different high-tech-markers and also colored grenades you can use and equip your team with. The scenario is you and your team are playing Gotcha (a.k.a. Paintball). You can play in a league with 28 teams and compete in 17 different locations. Multiplayer modes include Team Deathmatch, Capture the Flag, Flag Elimination, Team Elimination, Last Man Standing, and Kill the King. The character can crouch, lie down, or strafe. There are up to 12 fields around the earth with realistic weather effects. For online play, players can play around the Internet, LAN matches and Xbox Live tournaments with up to 12 players.

Weapons 
Markers: Markers are high-tech air pressure weapons with paintball ammunition. Pure fun is guaranteed!
- From pistol to automatic gun
- Paintball pumpgun
- Sniper-marker with telescopic sight
- Paint and smoke grenades

Reception 

Gotcha! Extreme Paintball received mixed to average reviews.

For Xbox Gamer's Etienne Froment, the game "is ultimately a pretty good surprise" on Xbox. Unlike Greg Hastings' Tournament Paintball, which "only offers fairly 'heavy' simulation", Gotcha! offers nervous gameplay and a terribly trippy atmosphere."

Cyril Dupont of Joystick gives the Windows version a 2/10, criticizing the game for a "glaring lack of dynamism for an FPS", and assures that "it's guaranteed boredom" and that there is "nothing to save the title".

Ludovic Bechtold of JeuxActu gives the score of 12/20 to the Windows version of the game, which he explains as follows: "We don't forget its shortcomings in artificial intelligence, its outdated graphics and its ridiculous animation, but I'm not ashamed to say yes, I had a great time on Gotcha! even if it only comes close to the great Counter-Strike. He points out as strong points the side "fun and fast to play" and the "numerous game modes".

Jean-Marc Wallimann of Jeuxvideo.com, testing the Windows version, also gave it a score of 12/20. He finds the maps to be small but satisfying: "They are full of places to hide and to wait in deceit for the arrival of opponents. However, we would have liked more so-called secret passages, or detours to have the choice of rushing into the heap or taking the opposite team from behind." Nicolas Charciarek, for his part, gives the Xbox version a score of 9/20. He makes a similar observation about the maps, but mentions "gameplay problems absent from the PC version which pollute the game", and judges the realization of the environments and the characters rude. He adds that "the solo mode is of limited interest, the bots being of a relative intelligence."

Kévin Kuipers of Gamekult gives the Windows version a score of 3/10. He says that "paintball is obviously sorely lacking in interest when played virtually, and Gotcha! proves it once again. According to him, the game's gameplay and artificial intelligence are bad. However, he appreciates "the technical aspect [...] very correct with well-modeled sets and some nice effects".

Thomas Weiss of PC Games gave a score of 5.2/10, stating that the game would have had a bigger appeal if it had the necessary technical requirements, such as spectacularly bursting projectiles. Graphically, the title "reminds of Counter-Strike instead: angular rooms, blurred textures, hardly any particle effects except for the pretty water". Gameplay isn't considered bad but just "ordinary".

For Sébastien Delahaye of NoFrag, "the game is of little interest", because of the "maddeningly stupid" AI, the "failed" gameplay, the "titou technique [and the] sound to match". He concludes by describing the game as "very beautiful crap".

The non-violent aspect of Gotcha! Extreme Paintball is praised by Kévin Kuipers, which makes it accessible to the little ones; for Jean-Marc Wallimann, the title is not just another version of terrorists facing counter-terrorists, but it wants to be more good-natured by aligning itself with the culture of paintball.

References

External links

 Gotcha! Extreme Paintball at PCGamingWiki

2004 video games
First-person shooters
Gathering of Developers games
Multiplayer and single-player video games
Multiplayer online games
Multiplayer video games
Paintball video games
Video games developed in Germany
Video games set in Argentina
Video games set in Australia
Video games set in France
Video games set in Germany
Video games set in Japan
Video games set in Mexico
Video games set in Russia
Video games set in Scotland
Video games set in the United Kingdom
Video games set in the United States
Vision (game engine) games
Windows games
Xbox games
Sixteen Tons Entertainment games
Viva Media games